İzmir's second electoral district is one of two divisions of İzmir province for the purpose of elections to Grand National Assembly of Turkey. It elects thirteen members of parliament (deputies) to represent the district for a four-year term by the D'Hondt method, a party-list proportional representation system. It covers northern and southeastern parts of İzmir.

Division
The second electoral district contains the following İzmir administrative districts (ilçe):

Aliağa
Bayındır
Bayraklı
Bergama
Beydağ
Bornova
Çiğli
Dikili
Foça
Karşıyaka
Kınık
Kiraz
Menemen
Ödemiş
Tire

Members

General elections

2011

References 

Electoral districts of Turkey